The Battle of Niangziguan (Niangziguan Zhandou, 娘子关战斗) was a battle fought between the communists and the nationalists during the Chinese Civil War in the post World War II era and resulted in communist victory.  The battle was a critical one in Zhengtai Campaign that helped to determine the outcome of the campaign.

Order of battle
Nationalist (1,000 total)
Shanxi 4th Security Regiment
Communist (2,000 total)
7th Brigade of Shanxi-Chahar-Hebei Military Region

Niangziguan (literally means Women's Pass, with Niangzi means women, and Guan means pass) was a strategically important pass that was easy to defend but difficult to attack.  The nationalist 4th Security Regiment of Shanxi, totaling around 1,000, defended the pass.

On April 24, 1947, the communist 7th Brigade of the Shanxi-Chahar-Hebei Military Region reached the pass, but instead of immediately attacking the defenders’ positions, the attackers sent out troops to outflank the defenders and penetrated the defenders’ position under the cover of darkness in the night.  At 3:00 AM on April 25, 1947, communist forces finally attacked under the cover of artillery shelling.  The defenders immediately came out of their fortifications to counterattack, but this proved to be a great mistake: venturing out of their fortifications allowed the defenders to be sealed off by the attacking enemy into several isolated groups that could not support each other, and without the fortifications, the stranded defenders were annihilated within three hours.

The communist victory ensured the control of the strategic pass and secured the safe passage of future troop movements for themselves while blocking the passage of nationalists, thus helped the communist to achieve final victory in Zhengtai Campaign.

See also
List of battles of the Chinese Civil War
National Revolutionary Army
History of the People's Liberation Army
Chinese Civil War

References

Zhu, Zongzhen and Wang, Chaoguang, Liberation War History, 1st Edition, Social Scientific Literary Publishing House in Beijing, 2000,  (set)
Zhang, Ping, History of the Liberation War, 1st Edition, Chinese Youth Publishing House in Beijing, 1987,  (pbk.)
Jie, Lifu, Records of the Liberation War: The Decisive Battle of Two Kinds of Fates, 1st Edition, Hebei People's Publishing House in Shijiazhuang, 1990,  (set)
Literary and Historical Research Committee of the Anhui Committee of the Chinese People's Political Consultative Conference, Liberation War, 1st Edition, Anhui People's Publishing House in Hefei, 1987, 
Li, Zuomin, Heroic Division and Iron Horse: Records of the Liberation War, 1st Edition, Chinese Communist Party History Publishing House in Beijing, 2004, 
Wang, Xingsheng, and Zhang, Jingshan, Chinese Liberation War, 1st Edition, People's Liberation Army Literature and Art Publishing House in Beijing, 2001,  (set)
Huang, Youlan, History of the Chinese People's Liberation War, 1st Edition, Archives Publishing House in Beijing, 1992, 
Liu Wusheng, From Yan'an to Beijing: A Collection of Military Records and Research Publications of Important Campaigns in the Liberation War, 1st Edition, Central Literary Publishing House in Beijing, 1993, 
Tang, Yilu and Bi, Jianzhong, History of Chinese People's Liberation Army in Chinese Liberation War, 1st Edition, Military Scientific Publishing House in Beijing, 1993 – 1997,  (Volum 1), 7800219615 (Volum 2), 7800219631 (Volum 3), 7801370937 (Volum 4), and 7801370953 (Volum 5)

Conflicts in 1947
Battles of the Chinese Civil War
1947 in China
Military history of Shanxi